Ypsolopha alpella is a moth of the family Ypsolophidae. It is found in southern and central Europe and Siberia.

The wingspan is approximately 16 mm. The moth flies from June to October depending on the location.

The larvae feed on oak.

External links
 waarneming.nl 
 Lepidoptera of Belgium
 Ypsolopha alpella at UKmoths

Ypsolophidae
Moths of Europe
Moths of Asia